Đurinići  is a village in Croatia. It is connected by the D516 highway.

Populated places in Dubrovnik-Neretva County
Konavle